Lago Oil & Transport Co. Ltd. had its beginning in 1924 as a shipping company carrying crude oil from Lake Maracaibo to its transshipment facility on the island of Aruba.

History
With the discovery of a vast amount of crude oil under Lake Maracaibo, but unable to send it to market because the channel into Lake Maracaibo was too shallow to allow oceangoing oil tankers to enter the lake, Pan American Petroleum and Transport Company, who held the lease on a large area of Lake Maracaibo, incorporated Lago Oil & Transshipment Co. The purpose of that company was to run lake tankers, to bring crude oil from Lake Maracaibo to Aruba. There, the oil  was stored ashore in large tanks, later loaded onto larger oceangoing tankers and taken to the United States for refining into finished petroleum products such as gasoline, diesel fuel, Bunker C and heating oil.

Refinery 
In 1928, Standard Oil of Indiana purchased the  Lago transshipment Pan American Petroleum facility in Aruba, as well as the oil holdings under Lake Maracaibo in Venezuela. Standard Oil of Indiana then began to build a small refinery next to the transshipping facility port.  Soon after the small refinery had been completed, a tax was anticipated to be imposed by the U S Government on imported crude.  Standard of Indiana had only marketing outlets in the United States and knew they could not compete when selling imported oil that had been burdened with a toll, so they sold all their holdings to Standard Oil of New Jersey, who had marketing outlets around the world. Standard Oil of New Jersey purchased not only the small refinery in Aruba, but also the vast holding in crude oil Standard of Indiana owned under Lake Maracaibo.

In 1938, Standard Oil of New Jersey obtained a contract to supply Britain with 100 octane aviation gasoline.  However, because of the isolationism that was prevalent in the United States (and which indeed resulted in the US staying neutral in WWII, until the end of 1941), the contract stated that the product had to be produced outside the United States.  Because Aruba was under Dutch control, the Lago refinery became an important asset by providing a place outside the United States where aviation gasoline could be produced without legal and international problems.  Thus, the size of that refinery expanded long before the United States entered World War II.

Wartime 
With the United States entry into World War II in 1942, the demand for Aviation gasoline further increased and considerable expansion was done at the Lago Refinery soon after that. With this expansion, Lago became one of the largest refineries in the world, only bested by Royal Dutch Shell refinery on Dutch-owned Curaçao, and a major producer of petroleum products for the Allied war efforts.

The importance of the Lago refinery was well known to the German High Command and an Attack on Aruba was performed. On February 16, 1942 the site was attacked by the German submarine U-156.  The submarine's deck gun exploded due to mistakes by the German deck gunner, and the refinery was not damaged. However, three of the lake tankers that carried crude oil from Lago Maracaibo were torpedoed.

Postwar 
When demand for gasoline was high after World War II, the Lago Refinery was running at full capacity and employed over 10,000 personnel.  About a thousand were foreign staff employees in supervisory positions and the remainder of the work force was from the native population of Aruba as well as "off-islanders", imported from mainly the British West Indies.  These employees lived in San Nicolaas and in the interior of the island, the foreign staff employees lived in a "company town" known as Lago Colony, which was east of the refinery.

In 1985, Exxon Corporation closed the Lago Refinery and began to dismantle the facility as well as the colony. Before the refinery was partially dismantled, it was taken over by the Aruba Government and sold to Coastal Corporation, which re-opened the refinery after a major overhaul but not nearly at its original capacity. Coastal later sold the refinery to Valero Energy Corporation.
Late 2017, Citgo Petroleum Corporation took over the refinery.

See also 
 Lake tanker
 Lago Colony

References

External links

 Valero Energy Corporation
 Lago Colony & Lago Refinery
 www.historiadiaruba.aw:  Lago Oil and Transport Company

Defunct oil companies of the United States
Tanker shipping companies
Defunct shipping companies
Companies of Aruba
History of Curaçao
Standard Oil
American companies established in 1924
Non-renewable resource companies established in 1924
Transport companies established in 1924
Non-renewable resource companies disestablished in 1985
1924 establishments in Curaçao and Dependencies
1920s establishments in Aruba
1980s disestablishments in Aruba